The Gran Chímu Province is one of twelve provinces of the La Libertad Region in Peru. The capital of this province is the city of Cascas.

Political division
The province is divided into four districts, which are:
 Cascas
 Marmot
 Lucma
 Sayapullo

Provinces of the La Libertad Region